Store Norske (literally meaning Great Norwegian) may refer to:

Store Norske Spitsbergen Kulkompani, a mining company in Svalbard
Store norske leksikon, an encyclopedia